Serhiy Mayboroda (born 21 November 1997 in Ukraine) is a professional Ukrainian football midfielder who plays for Dinaz Vyshhorod.

Career
Born in Bylbasivka, Sloviansk Raion, Mayboroda is a product of FC Olimpik Donetsk youth sportive school system.

He made his debut for FC Zorya as a substituted player in the second half-time in the match against FC Vorskla Poltava on 24 September 2017 in the Ukrainian Premier League.

Personal life
Father of Serhiy, Serhiy Maiboroda was a marine infantryman who was killed by the Russian occupation forces in 2019.

References

External links
 
 

1997 births
Living people
Ukrainian footballers
FC Zorya Luhansk players
FC Kramatorsk players
FC Uzhhorod players
FC Dinaz Vyshhorod players
Ukrainian Premier League players
Association football midfielders
Ukrainian First League players
Ukrainian Second League players
Sportspeople from Donetsk Oblast